The fourth and final season of Veronica Mars, an American drama television series created by Rob Thomas, consists of eight episodes that were all released on Hulu on July 19, 2019. It serves as a continuation of the 2004–07 television series as well as the 2014 film. Kristen Bell reprises her role as the title character, and it features the return of several characters from the original series as well as the introduction of new characters.

Production and development
On August 21, 2018, it was reported that Hulu was planning an eight-episode revival of Veronica Mars with Kristen Bell returning in the title role and series creator Rob Thomas returning as well. On September 6, 2018, it was reported that production would begin in October 2018 and continue through March 2019 in Los Angeles. Diane Ruggiero-Wright and Dan Etheridge returned as executive producers. On September 20, 2018, Hulu officially confirmed the revival, and announced it would premiere in 2019. The season was originally scheduled for release on July 26, 2019, however, during the series' appearance at San Diego Comic-Con on July 19, it was announced that season would be available that day.

Along with Thomas and Ruggiero, the writing staff consists of Heather V. Regnier, David Walpert, Raymond Obstfeld, and former NBA player and author Kareem Abdul-Jabbar.

Bell stated that the season was going to be darker and bigger and more cinematic, a little bit different" in comparison to the original series. Thomas stated the season takes place five years after the film and would "take Veronica Mars back to its hardcore So-Cal noir roots" and that it is "One big case [...] This is a detective show."

The revival features a new version of the original theme song, "We Used to Be Friends" by The Dandy Warhols, covered by Chrissie Hynde of The Pretenders.

Plot
Veronica Mars (Kristen Bell) and her father Keith (Enrico Colantoni) are private investigators in Neptune, California, a popular spring break vacation destination. Real estate developer Richard "Big Dick" Casablancas (David Starzyk) campaigns for the enactment of city beautification laws; local business owners protest the likely expense of complying with such laws. Meanwhile, Veronica rejects a marriage proposal from her longtime boyfriend Logan Echolls (Jason Dohring).

When a beachside motel is bombed, the Marses are hired to investigate by Congressman Daniel Maloof (Mido Hamada), whose brother's fiancée was killed in the explosion. A Mexican crime boss, whose nephew was another victim, sends two assassins, Alonzo (Clifton Collins Jr.) and Dodie (Frank Gallegos), to find and kill the bomber. Injured in the blast is Penn Epner (Patton Oswalt), a true crime enthusiast, who seizes the spotlight to accuse Maloof of the crime. The late motel owner's daughter, Matty Ross (Izabela Vidovic), investigates on her own; Veronica eventually takes her under her wing to supervise her. Veronica also befriends nightclub owner Nicole Malloy (Kirby Howell-Baptiste), and occasionally consults with Penn and his club of amateur crime-solvers.

Their investigation implicates a local ex-con, who apparently commits suicide before he can be arrested. However, after his death, three more bombs explode in Neptune over several days. The Marses uncover evidence that Casablancas's fixer Clyde Pickett (J. K. Simmons) has been hiring the local juvenile delinquents, organized by Veronica's former friend Eli "Weevil" Navarro (Francis Capra), to mug spring break visitors, driving away tourism; Casablancas is then able to buy beachfront property cheaply, planning to redevelop the land for more upscale businesses.

Veronica's ex-boyfriend Leo D'Amato (Max Greenfield), an FBI agent, arrives to investigate the case. His rekindled flirtation with Veronica eventually makes her realize how much she values her relationship with Logan. She loses her friendship with Nicole when she confesses to considering Nicole a suspect in the case and bugging her office, and decides to accept Logan's proposal.

The Marses eventually conclude that Casablancas was responsible for the bomb at the motel, but the subsequent bombs were the work of a copycat. Casablancas is murdered by Alonzo and Dodie after Clyde tips them off to his guilt. The Marses arrest Penn as the copycat, but he hires them to prove his own innocence. Evidence is uncovered which briefly implicates Penn's fellow amateur crime-solver Don (Clark Duke), but Matty spots that the evidence has been tampered with: Penn was the copycat bomber all along, out for glory and attention. The Marses deduce the site of the next bomb, and Keith disarms the bomb with seconds to spare; but Penn gloats to Veronica as he is being arrested.

Veronica and Logan are married that day. But a few hours later, Veronica's car explodes, killing Logan—one last bomb that Penn had set earlier. The next year, when Neptune is fully gentrified and spring break tourism is a thing of the past, Veronica leaves Neptune to solve cases on the road.

Cast

Main

 Kristen Bell as Veronica Mars, a private investigator
 Enrico Colantoni as Keith Mars, Veronica's father and a PI
 Jason Dohring as Logan Echolls, Veronica's boyfriend and a Naval Intelligence Officer

Starring
 Francis Capra as Eli "Weevil" Navarro, leader of the Pacific Coast Highway biker gang
 Clifton Collins Jr. as Alonzo Lozano, a mid-level hitman for a Mexican cartel
 Percy Daggs III as Wallace Fennel, Veronica's best friend, a high school physics teacher and varsity coach who is now married with a child
 Frank Gallegos as Dodie Mendoza, Alonzo's crime partner
 Max Greenfield as Leo D'Amato, an FBI agent and former boyfriend of Veronica
 Mido Hamada as Daniel Maloof, a Congressman
 Ryan Hansen as Dick Casablancas, Logan's friend and now a movie actor
 Kirby Howell-Baptiste as Nicole Malloy, the owner of a Neptune nightclub
 Dawnn Lewis as Marcia Langdon, the new police chief of Neptune
 Patton Oswalt as Penn Epner, a pizza delivery guy and true crime enthusiast who runs a websleuth group called "Murder Heads"
 David Starzyk as Richard Casablancas, Dick's father and wealthy businessman who is a suspect of the bombings
 Izabela Vidovic as Matty Ross, a teenager who loses her father in one of the bombings
 Jacqueline Antaramian as Amalia Maloof, Daniel's mother
 Paul Karmiryan as Alex Maloof, Daniel's younger brother
 J. K. Simmons as Clyde Pickett, an ex-con working as a fixer for Richard Casablancas

Recurring
 Daran Norris as Cliff McCormack, a public defender
 Ken Marino as Vinnie Van Lowe, a private investigator and competitor to Veronica and Keith
 Clark Duke as Don, a member of the Murder Heads
 Dannah Phirman as Carol, a member of the Murder Heads
 Tyler Alvarez as Juan-Diego De La Cruz, a member of the PCH biker gang
 Onahoua Rodriguez as Claudia, Weevil's sister
 Patrick Wolff as Hector, Weevil's friend and member of the PCH biker gang

Guest stars
 Eliza Coupe as Karsyn Farr, a wealthy client of Veronica
 Josh Duhamel as Magnus, Dick's co-star in Catalina Heat
 Rodney Rowland as Liam Fitzpatrick, head of the Fitzpatrick crime family who is now running a shady vending machine company
 Ryan Devlin as Mercer Hayes, a serial rapist in prison at Chino who Veronica caught in season three
 James Jordan as Tim Foyle, the man who killed Dean O'Dell in season three who is serving time in Chino
 Sarah Hyland as Alyssa, a spring breaker 
 Adam Rose as Max, Mac's ex-boyfriend who is now running a marijuana dispensary
 Christopher B. Duncan as Clarence Wiedman, a freelance security guard
 Mary McDonnell as Jane, Logan's therapist
 Kyle Secor as Jake Kane, software billionaire and owner of Kane Industries
 Duane Daniels as Van Clemmons, principal of the newly built Kane High
 Julie Gonzalo as Parker Lee, a former girlfriend of Logan
 Keith Morrison as himself

Episodes

Marketing and promotion
The first teaser trailer for the season was released on April 12, and the second on May 1, 2019. A panel for Veronica Mars took place in June 2019 at the ATX Television Festival. A full-length trailer was released on June 14.

Reception
On Rotten Tomatoes, the fourth season has an approval rating of 89% with an average score of 8 out of 10 based on 66 reviews. The site's critical consensus is, "Marshmallows, rejoice! Veronica Mars returns in fine form, capturing much of what made the series so beloved while adding new wrinkles that satisfy more often than they mystify." On Metacritic, the fourth season has a score of 75 out of 100 based on 16 critics, indicating "generally favorable reviews".

Home media
The season was released on DVD and Blu-ray (as "The Complete First Season (2019)") via the Warner Archive Collection in region 1 on October 22, 2019. Special features include the 2019 Veronica Mars San Diego Comic-Con panel.

References

External links
 Veronica Mars at Hulu
 

Veronica Mars episodes
2019 American television seasons